Scaphiodontophis annulatus, commonly known as the Guatemala neckband snake, is a species of snake in the family Colubridae. The species is native to southern Mexico, Central America, and Colombia. There are four recognized subspecies.

Geographic distribution
S. annulatus is found in Mexico, Belize, Colombia, El Salvador, Guatemala, Honduras, and Nicaragua.

Habitat

Subspecies
The following four subspecies are recognized as being valid.
Scaphiodontophis annulatus annulatus 
Scaphiodontophis annulatus dugandi 
Scaphiodontophis annulatus hondurensis 
Scaphiodontophis annulatus nothus

Reproduction
S. annulatus is oviparous.

Etymology
The subspecific name, dugandi, is in honor of Colombian biologist Armando Dugand.

References

Further reading
Duméril A-M-C, Bibron G, Duméril A[-H-A] (1854). Erpétologie générale ou histoire naturelle complète des reptiles. Tome septième [Volume 7]. Première partie. Comprenant l'histoire des serpents non venimeux. Paris: Roret. xvi + 780 pp. (Enicognathus annulatus, new species, pp. 335–336). (in French).
Heimes P (2016). Snakes of Mexico: Herpetofauna Mexicana Vol. I. Frankfurt am Main, Germany: Chimaira. 572 pp. .
Henderson RW (1984). "Scaphiodontophis (Serpentes: Colubridae): Natural History and Test of a Mimicry-Related Hypothesis". pp. 185–194. 'In: Seigel RA, Hunt LE, Knight JL, Malaret L, Zuschlag NL (1984). Vertebrate Ecology and Systematics: A Tribute to Henry S. Fitch. University of Kansas Museum of Natural History Special Publication No. 10. Lawrence: University of Kansas. viii + 278 pp.
Roze JA (1969). "Una nueva coral falsa del genero Scaphiodontophis (Serpentes: Colubridae) de Colombia ". Caldasia 10: 355–363. (Scaphiodontophis dugandi, new species, figures 1–3). (in Spanish, with an English summary). 
Schmidt KP (1936). "New Amphibians and Reptiles in the Museum of Comparative Zoology". Proceedings of the Biological Society of Washington 49: 43–50. (Sibynophis annulatus hondurensis, new subspecies, pp. 48–49).
Taylor EH, Smith HM (1943). "A Review of the American Sibynophine Snakes, with the Proposal of a New Genus". University of Kansas Science Bulletin 29': 301–337 + Plates XXI–XXV. (Scaphiodontophis nothus'', new species, pp. 320–322, Figure 8 + Plate XXIII, figure 2).

Scaphiodontophis
Snakes of Central America
Reptiles of Colombia
Reptiles of Mexico
Reptiles of Honduras
Reptiles of Nicaragua
Reptiles of Panama
Reptiles of Guatemala
Reptiles of El Salvador
Reptiles of Belize
Reptiles described in 1854
Taxa named by André Marie Constant Duméril
Taxa named by Gabriel Bibron
Taxa named by Auguste Duméril